The Seekonk River is a tidal extension of the Providence River in the U.S. state of Rhode Island. It flows approximately 8 km (5 mi). The name may be derived from an Algonquian word for skunk, or for black goose. The river is home to the Brown University men's rowing team, India Point Park, Blackstone Park, Crook Point Bascule Bridge, Narragansett Boat Club (the oldest rowing club in the country), Swan Point Cemetery, and the Bucklin Point waste-water treatment facility. The River is listed by RIDEM as an impaired waterway.

Course
The river begins where the Blackstone River reaches sea level below Pawtucket Falls. From there it flows due south between Providence and East Providence, picks up flow from the Ten Mile River, and eventually flows into the Providence River between Bold Point and India Point. The Seekonk River is the northernmost point of Narragansett Bay tidewater.

Slate Rock

A prominent boulder on the west shore of the Seekonk River (near the current Gano Park) was once one of Providence's most important historic landmarks. Slate Rock was said to be the spot where  a group of Narragansetts first welcomed the exiled Roger Williams in 1636 with the famous phrase "What cheer, netop?", and directed him to his eventual settlement location at the fork of the Woonasquatucket and Moshassuck Rivers.

The historic rock was accidentally blown up by city workers in 1877. They were attempting to expose a buried portion of the stone, but used too much dynamite and the stone was "blasted to pieces." Pieces of the stone were later sold for souvenirs. A monument in nearby Slate Rock Park commemorates the location.

Flora and fauna
The Seekonk River is home to numerous fauna that either migrate to the bay at some point during the year or live there year-round. There are several species of fish, shellfish and crab that have been documented. Birds include Loon, Cormorants, Herons, Gulls, Terns, Swans and Geese.

Numerous flora also make the Seekonk River their home both on land and underwater. Common aquatic vegetation includes grasses like spartina grass and phragmites in most high marsh areas and brown and green seaweed in the intertidal zone. Other vegetation that makes its home along the river include shrubs like rosa rugosa, various trees like the willow, oak and beech.

Crossings

Below is a list of all crossings over the Seekonk River. The list starts at the headwaters and goes downstream.
Pawtucket
Main Street Bridge 
Pawtucket River Bridge; Carries Interstate 95 and U.S. 1
Division Street Bridge
Providence
Henderson Bridge
Crook Point Bascule Bridge
Washington Bridge; Carries Interstate 195, U.S. 6 and U.S. 44.

Tributaries
Blackstone River
Ten Mile River
Bucklin Brook

See also
List of rivers in Rhode Island
Green Jacket Shoal, a ship graveyard at the mouth of the river

References

Maps from the United States Geological Survey

Rivers of Providence County, Rhode Island
Tributaries of Providence River
Geography of Providence, Rhode Island
East Providence, Rhode Island
Pawtucket, Rhode Island
Rivers of Rhode Island